Işıklar (literally "lights") is a Turkish word and may refer to:

Places
 Işıklar, a town in the central district of Afyonkarahisar, Turkey
 Işıklar, Baskil
 Işıklar, Bismil
 Işıklar, Bolu, a village in the central district of Bolu, Turkey
 Işıklar Caddesi, a street in Antalya, Turkey
 Işıklar, Çanakkale
 Işıklar, Karacasu, a village in Karacasu district of Aydın Province, Turkey
 Işıklar, Karpuzlu, a village in Karpuzlu district of Aydın Province, Turkey
 Işıklar, Manyas, a village
 Işıklar, Mustafakemalpaşa
 Işıklar, Mut, a village in Mut district of Mersin Province, Turkey
 Işıklar, Nazilli, a village in Nazilli district of Aydın Province, Turkey
 Işıklar, Sındırgı, a village
 Işıklar, Yeşilova